Gnoll may refer to:

Gnoll Country Park, a park in Wales
The Gnoll, a sports ground in Wales
Gnoll (fictional creature), a fictional species of human-hyena hybrids

See also 
 Gnole, a fictional entity in The Book of Wonder anthnology
 Knoll (disambiguation)
 Knol (disambiguation)